TCN is a television station in Sydney, Australia, with initials standing for "Television Corporation New South Wales".

TCN may also refer to:

Broadcasting 
 The Comedy Network, a Canadian comedy TV channel owned by Bell Media
 The Country Network, an American TV channel broadcasting country music videos
 The Comcast Network, a regional sports network owned by Comcast broadcasting in the Eastern United States
 The Cartoon Network, a holding company for Cartoon Network and Adult Swim brands, owned by Warner Bros. Discovery

Other organisations 
 Take Care Now, a former private company providing out-of-hours medical cover in England
 Transportation Communications Newsletter, an electronic newsletter published on weekdays about communications technology in the transportation industry
 The Curling News, a Canadian curling newspaper

Science and technology
 Tetracycline, an antibiotic used to treat conditions including cholera, brucellosis, plague, malaria and syphilis
 Train communication network, a fieldbus standard used in train control systems, described in IEC 61375
 Topology change notification in Spanning Tree Protocol, an ethernet networking protocol
 Terrestrial Cosmogenic nuclide, rare isotope found on the earth surface.

Other uses
 The Chronicles of Narnia, a series of seven fantasy novels for children written by C. S. Lewis
 Third country national, a term used in the context of migration and, in the U.S., regarding public-sector contracts